The following is a list of football stadiums in Cyprus, ordered by capacity.  Stadiums in bold are part of the 2022–23 Cypriot First Division.

Current stadiums

See also
List of European stadiums by capacity
List of association football stadiums by capacity

 
Cyprus
stadiums
Football stadiums